Youngblood (Original Motion Picture Soundtrack) is an album by the American band War, released in 1978. It is the soundtrack to the film of the same name.

The album peaked at No. 69 on the Billboard 200. The title track peaked at No. 21 on Billboard'''s Best Selling Soul Singles chart.

Production
The album was produced primarily by Jerry Goldstein. It was War's final album with B.B. Dickerson as a full member of the band; discounting Eric Burdon, it was also the band's final album with its original lineup. War and the film's studio used a multi-track synchronizing system, as did many soundtracks of the period.

"Youngblood (Livin' in the Streets)" begins with a conga introduction.

Critical reception

Robert Christgau wrote that "the level of the writing is suggested by the title of the best track, 'This Funky Music Makes You Feel Good'."

AllMusic wrote that "War got decent mileage from the soundtrack for this B-movie ... They ended with two R&B hits." The New Rolling Stone Record Guide'' determined that the soundtrack was among the United Artists albums "of uniformly high quality, stinging and angry at their peaks."

Track listing

References

War (American band) albums
1978 albums
United Artists Records albums